Donard (historically Dunard, from ) is a small village in County Wicklow, Ireland, located at the northern end of the Glen of Imaal, in the western part of the Wicklow Mountains.  

Donard takes its name from Dún Ard - High Fort - the ruins of which are still somewhat visible on a rise above the town. The tranquil village is surrounded by Table Mountain (702m), Church Mountain (546m), Lugnaquilla (924m) and Keadeen (655m). 

In the nearby village of Derrynamuck (also known as Dernamuck or Doire na Muc) is a cottage dedicated to the memory of Michael Dwyer, an Irish insurgent active during the 1798 Rebellion. There, an engagement between British forces and a detachment of United Irishmen rebels led by Dwyer, known as the Dwyer-English engagement, occurred on 15 February 1799. During the battle, a fellow insurgent, Sam McAllister, intentionally drew the direction of British fire towards himself in order to allow Dwyer to escape.

The highest mountain in Wicklow and one of the highest mountains in Ireland, second only to Carrauntoohil in Co. Kerry is Lugnaquilla, which can be accessed near the village of Donard. This mountain has a height of 925 metres(3,035ft). The Wicklow Mountain Rescue team operates in the area.

Much of the surrounding Glen of Imaal (5,948 acres) has been used as an army artillery range since 1900. 

A post office was opened in Donard in 1851 and An Post closed it at the end of 2018.

There are two pubs in Donard.  Toomey's Bar  and Monaghan's Bar.  There is a shop, O'Keeffe's Country Store,  and there is also a Caravan Campsite (Moat Farm) in Donard.

References 

Towns and villages in County Wicklow